The Taichung Martyr's Shrine is a martyrs' shrine in North District, Taichung, Taiwan dedicated to heroes of the Republic of China.

History
The shrine was originally a Shinto shrine to honor Japanese heroes. After the handover of Taiwan from Japan to the Republic of China in 1945, the Shinto shrine was reestablished and converted to a shrine that honor the National Revolutionary Army in 1970.

Architecture
The shrine was constructed with traditional Chinese architecture style. It has a rectangular shape surrounded by courtyards and garden.

Transportation
The shrine is accessible by bus north of Taichung Station of Taiwan Railways.

See also
 National Revolutionary Martyrs' Shrine

References

1970 establishments in Taiwan
Buildings and structures in Taichung
Martyrs' shrines in Taiwan
Religious buildings and structures completed in 1970